The Penha Hill is a hill in São Lourenço, Macau, China.

Geology
On its slope, lays many pieces of granites.

Features
At the top of the hill stands the Our Lady of Penha Chapel. There are also markets, hotels and restaurants around the hill.

See also
 Geography of Macau

References

Landforms of Macau
Macau Peninsula
Hills of China